Yang Sang-Jun  (born 21 November 1988) is a South Korean footballer who plays for Chungju Hummel in K League Challenge.

External links 

1988 births
Living people
South Korean footballers
Gyeongnam FC players
Chungju Hummel FC players
K League 1 players
K League 2 players
Association football forwards
People from Geoje
Sportspeople from South Gyeongsang Province